Mahesh Poddar was a member of Rajya Sabha from the Jharkhand constituency. He is an industrialist from Jharkhand.

He was the candidate for the biennial 2016 Rajya Sabha polls from Jharkhand. He won the polls by a narrow margin when his tally was increased using second preference votes. He got 2664 vote numbers as compared to 2600 vote numbers received by Jharkhand Mukti Morcha nominee Basant Soren.

Personal life 
He is the son of Late Shri Kedarnath Poddar, a wholesale cloth merchant from Gumla, Jharkhand. After completing his schooling in Gumla High School and St. Xavier's College, Ranchi, he moved to Bangalore to do his Mechanical Engineering from M.S. Ramaiah Institute of Technology. He is married to Nirmala Poddar and they both reside in Ranchi, Jharkhand.

Career 
A well known businessman; he started his career with establishing Miki Wire Works Pvt. Ltd. in the year 1977 in Mahilong, Ranchi. In the career span of almost forty years, he has expanded his wire manufacturing capacity to all parts of the country - Visakhapatnam, Bangalore and Nagpur. Manufacturing mainly pre-cast concrete wire in a varied range of diameters to cater to the infrastructure industry.

He has been actively involved in various groups and organisations, namely:
 Past Chairman - Steel Wire Manufacturers Association of India (2003-2006)
 Past President - Federation of Jharkhand Chamber of Commerce & Industries, Ranchi (1994-1995)
 Past President - Jharkhand Small Industries Association
 Director - Wire Association International
 Present member of Bureau of Indian Standards sub-committee on Long Products
 Present Trustee with Sri Sri Ravishankar Vidya Mandir Trust of Art of Living, Bangalore

References 

1958 births
Living people
Rajya Sabha members from Jharkhand
Bharatiya Janata Party politicians from Jharkhand